The list of school climate strikes lists school student strikes associated with the school strike for climate movement. The strikes began on 20 August 2018, when Swedish schoolgirl Greta Thunberg went on strike daily for several weeks, before switching to striking every Friday. The days of the largest strikes worldwide have been on 15 March 2019 (over a million people), 20 September 2019 (4 million people) and 27 September 2019 (2 million people). These September 2019 climate strikes were estimated to have involved up to 7.6 million people globally.

The strikes have grown to include people of all ages and from all walks of life, including scientists, politicians, and celebrities.

List

See also 
 September 2019 climate strikes

References

External links

2018 protests
2019 protests
2018 in the environment
2019 in the environment
Greta Thunberg
+
Student strikes
Direct action
2018 in education
2019 in education